Polynesicis hirsutus is a species of beetles in the family Ciidae, the only species in the genus Polynesicis.

References

Ciidae genera
Monotypic Cucujiformia genera